The Tourist Police Unit is a specialised unit of the Royal Malaysian Police which provide tourist and visitors information on law, customs, culture and attractions in the local community. Tourist Police uniforms are dark blue with a white peaked cap. Badges worn on left pocket also feature an "i", symbolising the international code for "information".

History
Tourist Police Unit in Malaysia were established by RMP in 1985 and is led by a commandant rank of Superintendent of Police. Tourist Police also help prevent crime in the areas which tourists visit.

Organisations
In Kuala Lumpur, four teams have been established to do daily patrol and to prevent any crime incident among tourists and local community itself. The four patrol teams are:
 Walking Patrol
 Motorcycle Patrol
 Bicycle Patrol
 Patrol Car Crew

Miscellaneous
In 2005, the state police of Malacca in co-operation with the Malacca City Historic Council (MBMB) established the "Tourist Police Mounted Unit" to maintain security and to aid tourists visiting the state.

Their motto is "Friendly, Fast and Right". As such, Tourist Police maintain contact with travel agencies, hotels, airlines, bus and taxi companies to help tourists find any information they may need. The Tourist Police help improve the country's image in the eyes of tourists.

References

External links

  Royal Malaysian Police official website
 Welcome Malaysia-Tourist Police information

Royal Malaysia Police
Tourism in Malaysia
1985 establishments in Malaysia